The 1803 Ottoman Invasion of Mani was one of a series of invasions by the Ottomans to subdue the Maniots. Mani was the only region of Greece that the Ottomans had not occupied due to the rough terrain and the rebellious spirit of the Maniots. The Maniots caused damage to the Ottomans by allying with the Venetians whenever there was a war between Venice and the Ottomans; they also were pirates.

Zanetos Grigorakis was appointed bey of Mani and had assumed the name of Zanetbey. He however in 1798 was plotting with French agents who were sent by Napoleon to organise a Maniot invasion of the Peloponnese while Napoleon attacked the Levant. Once the Ottomans heard this, they had Zanet disposed and outlawed. Zanet however continued to communicate with the French and they sent him a shipment of weapons. Once the Ottomans heard of this, they sent an army under the command of the Capitán Pasha to lay siege to Zanet's island fort on Cranae. After a short siege Zanet fled from the forts and hid inland. The Ottomans then returned to their base in Tripoli.

Prelude
The failed Orlov Revolt had been a disaster for Mani and in 1770, the Ottoman bey of the Peloponnese, Hassán Ghazi, invaded Mani with a large force of Turko-Albanians. Their army laid siege to the Grigorakis tower in Skoutari which was garrisoned by fifteen men. The tower held out for three days until it was undermined and gunpowder was placed underneath the tower which was then set alight and blown up.

The Ottomans then advanced to the plain of 'Vromopidaga' where they defeated by the vastly outnumbered Maniots. Ghazi then lured the Maniots' leader Éxarchos and had him hung. His mother then had the men of Skoutari under Zanet trick the Turkish garrison at Passavas and sacked the city.

In 1784, Zanet was lured onto an Ottoman ship and was given the choice of his life or to accept the title of bey and Ottoman vassalage. For four years since the last Ottoman invasion, Zanet had refused offers to become bey but under the pressure of this threat he accepted. But in 1798 he was caught conspiring with French agents. He was disposed and outlawed but he continued to cause trouble for the Ottomans from his fort at Cranae. In 1803, a load of French weapons was delivered to his fort. Once the Ottomans found out, they decided it was time to stop Zanet.

The Invasion
After he was delivered the weapons, Zanet prepared his fort for a siege. The Capitán-Pasha advanced with a large force of Turko-Albanians into Mani and set up camp at Gytheio which was opposite Cranae. Zanet with his sons and loyal supporters was well equipped with the French weapons and could withstand a short siege. The Ottoman fleet blockaded the island and the Ottoman artillery caused severe damage to Zanet's cause. After a while Zanet slipped out of the fort during the night and fled inland. With Zanet gone the Ottomans abandoned the siege.

Aftermath
Zanet's death came in 1808, while he was organising more raids into Ottoman territory. Antony Grigorakis became bey in 1802 and in 1807 his reluctance to deal with his cousin Zanet caused another Ottoman invasion. The Ottomans also tried to invaded Mani in 1815 but were repulsed. The Ottoman control over the rest of Greece ended in 1821 when the Greeks declared their independence.

Sources
Peter Greenhalgh and Edward Eliopoulos. Deep into Mani: Journey to the Southern Tip of Greece. 

Conflicts in 1803
Ottoman invasions of Mani
19th century in Greece
1803 in the Ottoman Empire